Nadakuduru is a big village situated in Kakinada district near Kakinada town, in Andhra Pradesh State.

Geography
It is located on the West Face of Bay of Bengal.

Demographics
Total population of Nadakuduru is 6266. Males are 3148 and Females are 3,118 living in 1524 Houses.In Nadukuduru village Sureddi Veedhi is unique.It is very popular for the family of Sureddi

References

http://censusindia.gov.in/

Villages in Kakinada district